Helios Investment Partners is a private equity investing firm operating in Africa and based in London, United Kingdom, with additional offices in Nairobi, Kenya and Lagos, Nigeria.

Overview 
Helios Investment Partners was established in 2004 by Babatunde Soyoye and Tope Lawani and it operates a range of funds valued at more than $3 billion in capital commitments. These investments include start ups, growth equity investments, listed companies and large scale leveraged acquisitions across the continent of Africa.

The key sectors in which the firm operates in include telecommunications, media, financial services, power, utilities, travel, leisure, distribution, fast-moving consumer goods, logistics and Agro–allied sectors.

Portfolio

Current investments 
Helios Investment Partners portfolio investments include but are not limited to the following:

Exited Investments 
 Equity Group Holdings – Nairobi, Kenya –  24.99% Shareholding
 Telkom Kenya Limited – Nairobi, Kenya –  60% Shareholding
 Vivo Energy – 40% Shareholding

References

External links 
 Helios Investment Partners
 Company Overview of Helios Investment Partners LLP

Private equity firms
Financial services companies established in 2004